Gila Helena Bergqvist Ulfung (born Gila Helena Hasson 28 November 1967 in Brännkyrka) is a Swedish producer, television presenter and actress. She is best known for her role in the Ronny and Ragge series Byhåla which was broadcast on SVT from 1991 to 1993.

References

1967 births
Living people